Lutheran Theological Seminary may refer to:

 Bethany Lutheran Theological Seminary
 Concordia Lutheran Theological Seminary, St. Catharines, Ontario
 Northwestern Lutheran Theological Seminary, now called Luther Seminary, Saint Paul, Minnesota
 Lutheran Theological Seminary at Gettysburg
 Lutheran Theological Seminary at Philadelphia
 Lutheran Theological Seminary, Saskatoon 
 Lutheran Theological Southern Seminary in Columbia, South Carolina
 Pacific Lutheran Theological Seminary, Berkeley, California
 Lutheran Theological Seminary, Leipzig

See also
Lutheran Theological Southern Seminary, Columbia, South Carolina
List of Lutheran seminaries in North America